The Proudest Blue: A Story of  Hijab and Family is a children's picture book written by Ibtihaj Muhammad and S.K. Ali, illustrated by Hatem Aly, and published September 10, 2019 by Little, Brown Books for Young Readers. The book is a New York Times best seller.

Reception 
The Proudest Blue received starred reviews from Kirkus, Publishers Weekly, School Library Journal, and Booklist, as well as a positive review from The New York Times.

The book also received the following accolades:

 Goodreads Choice Award for Picture Books nominee (2019)
 Booklist Editors' Choice: Books for Youth (2019)
 Rise: A Feminist Book Project top ten (2020)
 ALSC's Notable Children's Books (2020)

References 

2019 children's books
Little, Brown and Company books
American picture books